Girls spinning at the gate (Romanian: Fete lucrând la poartă) is a painting by Romanian painter Nicolae Grigorescu, from the period 1885 to 1890.

Description 
The painting has dimensions of 42.5 x 62.5 centimeters.

The picture belongs to the National Museum of Art of Romania, Bucharest.

Analysis 
The picture shows two people in folk costumes sitting on a bench near a gate in a wood fence, and spinning, while light brings the surrounding landscape into the foreground.

References 

1880s paintings
1890s paintings
Romanian paintings